Dead Man Falling is a crime novel by the American writer Randall Silvis.

Set in 1990s in the Allegheny National Forest of Western Pennsylvania on the upper Allegheny River Valley, including the Kinzua Dam north Pittsburgh, it tells the story of wildlife filmmaker Mac Parris, who has spent most of his adult life hiding from the FBI and his own past, as he helps a young woman find her brother's killer.

References

1996 American novels
American crime novels
Novels set in Pennsylvania
Allegheny National Forest
Carroll & Graf books